Marius Eriksen (8 December 1922 – 6 July 2009) was a Norwegian skier, fighter pilot, model and actor.

Eriksen was born on 8 September 1922 in Kristiania (now Oslo) in Norway.  His father, also called Marius Eriksen, was a gymnast who competed for Norway at the 1912 Summer Olympics.  His mother was Birgit Eriksen. During his early years, Eriksen (junior) gained some success at slalom skiing and ski jumping.  Eriksen's younger brother, Stein Eriksen, went on to win an Olympic gold medal in skiing.

Following the outbreak of World War II, Eriksen fled Norway, leaving on 5 November 1940 via Ålesund. After arriving in Scotland, he made his way to Canada, where he underwent flying training at Little Norway, the Norwegian Army Air Service flight training school.

On his return to the United Kingdom, Eriksen served with No. 331 (Norwegian) Squadron RAF and then No. 332 (Norwegian) Squadron RAF as a fighter pilot flying Spitfires.  He achieved nine kills, making him one of Norway's aces, before he was shot down off the coast of the Netherlands attempting a head-on attack against a Focke-Wulf Fw 190. Eriksen survived and after being captured on 2 May 1943, he was held as a prisoner of war at Stalag Luft III in Poland until 1945. He began his service with the RAF as a Sergeant, but was later commissioned as a Second Lieutenant. In recognition of his wartime service, Eriksen was awarded the War Cross with Sword, St. Olav's Medal With Oak Branch, Haakon VIIs 70th Anniversary Medal, the Norwegian War Medal, the Norwegian Defence Medal, the British Distinguished Flying Medal, and the American Silver Star.

After the war, Eriksen became the Norwegian champion in alpine skiing in both 1947 and 1948. He also competed in two events at the 1948 Winter Olympics.

In 1953, his mother, who was a keen knitter, designed a variation of the Setesdal traditions in Norway. sweater. Another variation of Setesdals patterns, designed by Unn Søiland, later became Norway's most popular knitting pattern, known as The Marius pattern, the pattern that Marius Eriksen is wearing in the film Troll i ord. The picture of Marius Eriksen from the film was later used as the front cover of the knitting pattern that later became the most popular knitting pattern in Norway.

After the war, Eriksen pursued a film career in the 1950s.  He appeared in two films in 1954, debuting in Troll i ord (Watch What You Say) before going on to Kasserer Jensen (a comedy in which he was a journalist with the Norwegian daily Dagbladet).  In 1957 he starred as Lieutenant Colonel Eriksen in Slalåm under himmelen (Slalom beneath the Sky), a war film.

Eriksen's autobiography Marius: skiløper - jageress - krigsfange (Marius: skier - fighter ace - prisoner of war) was published in Norway in 2002.

He had five children with Bente Ording Eriksen, including Beate Eriksen (born 1960), who became an actress and film director.

Honours and awards
 War Cross with Sword
 St. Olav's Medal With Oak Branch
 War Medal
 Defence Medal 1940–1945
 Haakon VII 70th Anniversary Medal
 Distinguished Flying Medal (United Kingdom)
 Silver Star (United States)

References

External links

 abcnyheter.no - Mannen i Mariusgenseren er død Obituary (in Norwegian)

1922 births
2009 deaths
Norwegian Army Air Service personnel of World War II
Norwegian World War II flying aces
Shot-down aviators
Royal Air Force airmen
World War II prisoners of war held by Germany
Norwegian prisoners of war in World War II
Norwegian expatriates in Canada
Recipients of the Distinguished Flying Medal
Recipients of the Silver Star
Recipients of the War Cross with Sword (Norway)
Recipients of the St. Olav's Medal with Oak Branch
Norwegian male alpine skiers
Norwegian memoirists
Male actors from Oslo
Olympic alpine skiers of Norway
Alpine skiers at the 1948 Winter Olympics
20th-century memoirists